Euchoristea is a genus of moths of the family Noctuidae.

References 
 Natural History Museum Lepidoptera genus database

Hadeninae